Papa John's International, Inc., d/b/a Papa Johns, is an American pizza restaurant chain. It is the fourth largest pizza delivery restaurant chain in the United States, with headquarters in Louisville, Kentucky and Atlanta, Georgia metropolitan areas.

Papa John’s global presence has reached over 5,500 locations in 49 countries and territories; and is currently the world’s third-largest pizza delivery company.

History

1984–2009

The Papa John's restaurant was founded in 1984 when "Papa" John Schnatter installed an oven inside a broom closet in the back of his father's tavern, Mick's Lounge, in Jeffersonville, Indiana. He then sold his 1971 Camaro Z28 to purchase US$1,600 worth of used pizza equipment and began selling pizzas to the tavern's customers out of the converted closet. His pizzas proved sufficiently popular that a year later he moved into an adjoining space. Dipping sauce specifically for pizza was invented by Papa John's Pizza that same year, and has since become popular when eating pizza, especially the crust. The company went public in 1993. A year later it had 500 stores, and by 1997 it had opened 1,500 stores. In 2009, Schnatter bought the Camaro back after offering a reward of $250,000 for the car.

2010s 
On May 22, 2010, the first ever Bitcoin transaction was made between Laszlo Hanyecz and Jeremy Sturdivant. The swap involved an agreement to trade 10,000 bitcoins for two large Papa John's pizzas. The day is now celebrated annually by bitcoin enthusiasts as "Bitcoin Pizza Day", on May 22.

On January 1, 2018, John Schnatter stepped down as CEO of Papa John's Pizza in favor of company President Steve Ritchie; Schnatter remained chairman. In February 2018, Papa John's and the NFL  ended their sponsorship agreement after Schnatter's criticism of the NFL made headlines.

On July 11, 2018, news outlets reported that during a conference call with the marketing agency Laundry Service that was working under contract for Papa John's, Schnatter had used the word "nigger" by saying "Colonel Sanders called blacks niggers and Sanders never faced public backlash." Schnatter said that referencing the quote by the KFC founder was meant to convey his dislike for racism. After the call, the owner of the marketing agency moved to end their contract with Papa John's. Schnatter resigned as chairman of the board on the day the incident was reported.

After the incident, Ritchie apologized in an open letter, and ordered the company's workforce to undergo bias and diversity training.

On July 26, 2018, John Schnatter filed a lawsuit against Papa John's Pizza to give him access to the company's internal books and records after they fired him from the company after the teleconference call scandal. He describes the company's procedures as an "unexplained and heavy-handed way" to cut ties between him and the company that he founded. In addition to preventing him from accessing information, the corporation also implemented a poison pill strategy in order to limit Schnatter's chances of buying back a majority stake in the company.

On February 4, 2019, it was announced that the activist hedge fund Starboard Value, which had played a large role in turning around the troubled Olive Garden restaurant chain, would be investing $200 million into Papa John's Pizza and that Starboard could possibly invest an additional $50 million by March 29, 2019. It was simultaneously announced that Starboard Value CEO Jeff Smith would become the new Papa John's chairman and that Anthony Sanfilippo, former CEO of the gaming company Pinnacle Entertainment, would be another addition to the company's board. Following that announcement, Ritchie said that he hoped the deal would put an end to the ongoing feud with Schnatter, telling CNBC's David Faber, "Obviously, we're very hopeful that we can bring John along." However, Schnatter has expressed concerns that Ritchie is not the right executive for Papa John's.

On March 5, 2019, Papa John's announced a settlement with Schnatter under which he will resign from the company's board of directors at the company's annual meeting on April 30 or when a mutually acceptable independent director is appointed to replace him, whichever comes first. Schnatter agreed to dismiss two lawsuits filed against the company and to withdraw his plan to run for a seat on the board at the annual meeting. Papa John's agreed to remove the "acting in concert" provisions from its "poison pill" plan that prevented Schnatter from communicating with other company shareholders.  Schnatter, who then still controlled 31% of Papa John's shares, issued a statement saying he was "thankful that I've been able to resolve these important issues" and hoped everyone could now "focus on the company's business without the need for additional litigation". The company also agreed to remove a requirement that Starboard Value, which owns about 10% of the company, must vote in favor of the incumbent board.

In March 2019, NBA Hall of Famer Shaquille O'Neal joined Papa John's board of directors and became a spokesman for the brand. The next year, Papa John's introduced the Shaq-a-Roni, a pizza dedicated to O'Neal.

Amidst these changes, in May 2019, Schnatter began selling off his shares in the company. Initially starting with 9.8 million shares. Throughout the next year, he had reduced his stock ownership to just 4%.

On August 27, 2019, Papa John's announced that Arby's President Robert M. Lynch would be the new CEO replacing Steve Ritchie, who was handpicked by founder John Schnatter to succeed him in 2018.

2020s 

In September 2020, Papa John's announced plans to establish a new headquarters in the Atlanta metropolitan area. In November, the company announced its new global headquarters would be located in Three Ballpark Center at The Battery Atlanta. The existing headquarters in Jeffersontown, Kentucky, a community within the merged government of Louisville, was retained, and currently houses the IT, supply chain, and legal departments.

In November 2021, Papa John's announced it was rebranding its logo (by removing the apostrophe and simplifying the design) and store locations.

In March 2022, Papa John's suspended its business operations in Russia in response to the 2022 Russian invasion of Ukraine, but independent franchisee-owned locations remained open.

Operations

Papa John's primarily takes carryout and delivery orders, although some restaurants have tables and chairs for dining in.

Franchise owners pay a one-off franchise fee of US$25,000 per restaurant, then a royalty fee of 5% of net sales, plus a charge for advertising of 8% of net sales. The company requires franchisees to have net worth of at least $250,000, the approximate amount of investment needed. Corporate operations look over franchisees to ensure brand consistency. Papa John's International is a publicly traded company.

Based on 2019 sales information provided by Technomic, PMQ Pizza Magazine reported that the company was the fourth-largest take-out and pizza delivery restaurant chain in the United States. (According to PMQ, Little Caesars is the third-largest pizza chain.) The company's net profitability though, is far behind its main competitors. In 2014, its net margin was 4.6% of total sales, whereas Domino's Pizza's net margin was 8.2% and Yum! Brands, which owns Pizza Hut, was 7.9%.  Its slogan is "Better Ingredients. Better Pizza. Papa John's."

Papa John's has over 5,199 establishments—4,456 franchised restaurants operating domestically in all 50 states, and in 44 countries and territories. Papa John's operates 246 "company owned stores" under joint ventures and 35 units in Beijing and North China. In September 2012 the 4,000th Papa John's Pizza restaurant opened, in New Hyde Park, New York. The company celebrated the event by giving away 4,000 free pizzas to customers throughout New York City.

In January 2002, Papa John's became the first national pizza chain to make online ordering available to all of its U.S. customers. Most other national chains later added online ordering to their services. On July 10, 2004, Papa John's controlled an estimated 6.6% of the market, according to Technomic.

In February 2017, it was reported by the Associated Press that the company was testing a "Papa Priority" $2.99 fee that lets people jump to the head of the line for their pizza order.

Franchises outside the U.S.

Europe
Papa John's has operated in the United Kingdom since 1999. In July 2015, the company had 300 shops in the UK, although in 2010 it had plans for the number rising to between 400 and 500 within the next five years.

Papa John's operates throughout Ireland, with its head office at Ballybrit, County Galway. The company has over 50 locations and operates mobile units around the country. The franchises are often located adjacent to Supermacs fast food outlets, whose parent company owns the exclusive franchise rights for the chain in Ireland.

Spain is the second most important European market for Papa John's. The chain has been operating in Spain since 2016, and  had 42 restaurants by late 2017. In particular, the restaurants achieved a significant presence in the Madrid province with more than half of the Spanish restaurants being located there. Papa John's expects to open at least 100 restaurants just in the province of Madrid, as well as expanding to other regions across Spain.

Papa John's also operated in Russia and Belarus with plans to expand to several other European and Central Asian countries.

Papa John's restaurants in Portugal began operating in 2005 but closed some time later.

In Poland, Papa John's opened their first location in 2017.

In 2018, Papa John's opened their first restaurant in Kazakhstan, which became the 46th country in the world where the chain is represented.

In May 2019, it was announced that Papa John's would enter the German market by taking over Halle/Salle-based Uno Pizza and converting their stores into Papa John's, with the aim of opening up to 250 locations in Germany in the following five to seven years.

After a failed step in the early 2000s, in 2019 Papa John's  returned to Portugal with a restaurant in Lisbon and plans to expand to other parts of the country.

In the Netherlands Papa John's opened its doors in 2019, starting in Amsterdam and expending further through the Netherlands in 2019.

Latin America

Papa John's operates in 13 Latin American countries, including Colombia, Chile, and Mexico.

India
Papa John's entered the Indian market in 2006 with its first store opening in Noida, Uttar Pradesh with an aim to open up 100 stores in India. They couldn't keep up the efficient sophisticated ordering technology and fast delivery methods of their rivals Domino's Pizza and Pizza Hut in India. When Papa John's started in 2006, Domino's Pizza already had 126 branches. By 2017, Papa John's decided to exit the country completely, having opened only 66 stores and being unable to compete with Domino's Pizza and Pizza Hut, which had  entered in the mid-1990s.

Other parts of Asia

In 2018, Papa John's sold ownership of its 34 corporate-owned locations in Beijing, shutting down their operations in China.

Papa John's opened its first store in Lahore, Pakistan in early 2019.

Sponsorships
On March 30, 2006, Six Flags announced that its parks' pizza would exclusively be from Papa John's. In turn, Six Flags received an annual sponsorship and promotional opportunities from Papa John's. Papa John's is also the official pizza supplier of the Olympic Speedskating Oval in Calgary, Alberta, Canada.

In November 2006, Papa John's signed with ESPN Regional Television to become the title sponsor of the annual PapaJohns.com Bowl, a college post-season football bowl game in Birmingham, Alabama, which Papa John's continued to sponsor through 2010.

In 2010, Papa John's signed an agreement to be the Official Pizza Sponsor of the National Football League and Super Bowls XLV, XLVI and XLVII. In 2011, Papa John's became the official Pizza Sponsor of the NFL in Canada, Mexico and the United Kingdom. In October 2012, Denver Broncos quarterback Peyton Manning became a franchisee in the Denver area for Papa John's, and also purchased 21 franchises in the area. In July 2013, Papa John's announced it had become the Official Pizza Partner of The Football League in the UK. The sponsorship ended after the 2017 season when Pizza Hut became the official pizza of the NFL in February 2018.

The company was the former beneficiary of the naming rights to Papa John's Cardinal Stadium used by the University of Louisville's football team, in exchange for Schnatter personally donating $5 million for the rights. Schnatter made a further $10 million donation for the stadium's expansion, and extended the naming rights to the year 2040. The Papa John's name was taken off the stadium in July 2018, after Schnatter's resignation from the company.

In 2020, Papa John's became the main sponsor of the EFL Trophy, a football competition for lower league and under-23 clubs in England.

Controversies

Papa John's received attention in May 2008 when a Washington, D.C. franchise distributed T-shirts making fun of Cleveland Cavaliers star player LeBron James at a playoff game against the Washington Wizards. Photographs of the shirts quickly spread from the Internet to Cleveland television. Increasing awareness of the controversy prompted an apology from the Papa John's national headquarters on May 5. To apologize, Papa John's offered large single-topping pizzas for 23 cents (matching James' jersey number) at all locations in Greater Cleveland and throughout northern Ohio. The chain sold over 172,000 pizzas at 23 cents a piece, with customers waiting in lines outside of some stores for as long as three hours.

Papa John's also received media attention on January 6, 2012, when an employee typed the phrase "lady chinky eyes" on a receipt issued to an Asian American customer at a restaurant in New York City. The employee was fired and the company issued a formal apology. A manager at the restaurant where the incident occurred told the New York Post that the cashier, a teenager, did not intend to offend saying, "It's a busy place, and it was a way to identify her and her order. You know, we do stuff like that sometimes. We'll write 'the lady with the blue eyes' or 'the guy in the green shirt.' I think the lady put it out there just to get some attention, some people like that type of attention."

John Schnatter's claim that a reverse in NFL viewer ratings (supposedly because of the NFL kneeling controversy) had directly led to decreased same-store sales across Papa John's franchises was extensively reported in November 2017. It was estimated that Schnatter's personal holdings in the chain had lost millions of dollars in value. Papa John's disavowed statements by white supremacist groups expressing support for the brand in the wake of Schnatter's comments.

A media report surfaced on July 11, 2018, claiming that Schnatter had used a racial epithet in a conference call the previous May, along with graphic descriptions of violence against racial minorities. Forbes magazine reported that a media agency working with Papa John's severed its relationship with the company following the report. Steve Ritchie, who had replaced Schnatter as CEO, responded with a memo stating that "racism has no place at Papa John's," and a company spokesman wrote in an email that Papa John's "condemns racism". The same day, Schnatter admitted to using the racial epithet during the conference call and resigned as chairman of the company's board of directors. On July 13, 2018, top executives of the company decided to remove Schnatter's image from marketing materials.

Litigation
In 1997, Pizza Hut filed a lawsuit against Papa John's based on a series of advertisements that compared the ingredients of Papa John's and its competitors. Pizza Hut successfully argued that Papa John's slogan did not constitute statements of literal fact – that "fresher ingredients" do not necessarily account for a "better" pizza. This ruling was overturned in 2000 when Papa John's appealed the decision. Although the jury's decision on the misleading advertising was upheld, the appeals court determined that Pizza Hut failed to prove, under the requirements of the Lanham Act, that the misleading advertising and puffery had a material effect on consumers' purchasing decisions.

In 2012, the company was the subject of a class-action lawsuit for allegedly sending over 500,000 unwanted text messages to customers. The suit sought over $250 million in damages, though the company settled to pay $16.5 million, awarding claimants up to $50 in damages, and a free, large, one-topping pizza.

In August 2015, Papa John's agreed to pay $12.3 million to settle a class-action lawsuit in which the company was accused of undercompensating 19,000 delivery drivers in the states of Arizona, Florida, Illinois, Maryland, Missouri and North Carolina. The complaint stated that the flat reimbursement amount per delivery for drivers failed to equal minimum wage.

In July 2016, Panera Bread filed a lawsuit with the U.S. Eastern District Court in Missouri accusing Papa John's of stealing digital trade secrets and proprietary data management strategies by hiring Michael Nettles, a former Panera executive who was in charge of the chain's corporate digital technologies deployment. In August, a Federal judge issued a restraining order, preventing Nettles from reporting to work at Papa John's while the case was active. Later that year, Panera told the Federal court that it had agreed to drop the lawsuit in December 2016. Details that led to the lawsuit being dropped were not made public.

See also

 Cardinal Stadium – a football stadium on the campus of the University of Louisville formerly bearing the company's name via a naming rights agreement
 List of pizza chains
 List of pizza chains of the United States
 List of pizza franchises
 List of pizza varieties by country
 List of major employers in Louisville, Kentucky
 List of the largest fast food restaurant chains

References

External links

 

1984 establishments in Indiana
American companies established in 1984
Companies based in Louisville, Kentucky
Companies based in Atlanta
Companies listed on the Nasdaq
Fast-food chains of the United States
Fast-food franchises
Pizza chains of Canada
Pizza chains of the United Kingdom
Pizza chains of the United States
Pizza franchises
Restaurant chains in the United States
Restaurants established in 1984
1993 initial public offerings
Jeffersontown, Kentucky